The list of shipwrecks in 1956 includes ships sunk, foundered, grounded, or otherwise lost during 1956.

January

2 January

5 January

6 January

7 January

8 January

10 January

12 January

17 January

21 January

23 January

29 January

22 January

Unknown date

February

3 February

4 February

8 February

10 February

14 February

16 February

18 February

19 February

29 February

March

1 March

3 March

9 March

10 March

11 March

14 March

16 March

18 March

20 March

24 March

28 March

April

9 April

12 April

13 April

17 April

20 April

27 April

May

5 May

7 May

9 May

14 May

18 May

20 May

24 May

28 May

29 May

30 May

31 May

Unknown date

June

8 June

12 June

17 June

21 June

22 June

24 June

26 June

30 June

July

5 July

8 July

11 July

15 July

16 July

17 July

23 July

25 July

29 July

30 July

31 July

August

1 August

9 August

11 August

12 August

14 August

15 August

19 August

20 August

22 August

25 August

26 August

September

7 September

8 September

11 September

12 September

13 September

15 September

16 September

17 September

25 September

29 September

October

8 October

9 October

10 October

12 October

14 October

20 October

21 October

22 October

23 October

27 October

31 October

Unknown date

November

1 November

3 November

4 November

5 November

6 November

14 November

16 November

19 November

20 November

21 November

Unknown date

December

3 December

12 December

14 December

17 December

20 December

26 December

Unknown date

References

1956
 
Ships